Rudolf "Rudi" Linz (14 February 1917 – 9 February 1945) was a Luftwaffe (German air force) fighter ace during World War II. He is credited with 70 aerial victories achieved in an unknown number of combat missions, becoming an "ace-in-a-day" on four separate occasions. All but two of his aerial victories were claimed on the Eastern Front. On 9 February 1945, he was shot down and killed in action in defense of the German destroyer Z33 and posthumously awarded the Knight's Cross of the Iron Cross on 12 March.

Career
Linz was born on 14 February 1917 in Ilmenau, at the time in the Grand Duchy of Saxony of the German Empire. On 10 March 1942, he was posted to the 8. Staffel (8th squadron) of Jagdgeschwader 5 (JG 5–5th Fighter Wing), at the time holding the rank of Unteroffizier. The Staffel was headed by Oberleutnant Hermann Segatz while III. Gruppe (3rd group) of JG 5 to which the squadron was subordinated was commanded by Hauptmann Günther Scholz.

War on the Arctic Front

On 20 April, 8. Staffel moved to an airfield at Petsamo, present-day Pechenga in Murmansk Oblast, Russia. On 25 May, Luftwaffe aerial reconnaissance spotted Convoy PQ 16 heading for Murmansk and Arkhangelsk while Convoy QP 12 left Murmansk. From 25 to 30 May, Luftwaffe units attacked both convoys. In these attacks, Linz claimed his first aerial victory on 30 May. He was presented with the Iron Cross 1st Class by Generaloberst Hans-Jürgen Stumpff on account of his II. and III. Gruppe visit at Pechenga on 19 June.

In 1943, Linz served as a fighter pilot instructor Ergänzungs-Jagdgruppe West, a supplementary training unit based in Cazaux, France. Back from his tour as an instructor, Linz claimed two Lend-Lease Curtiss P-40 Warhawk on a mission to Murmashi and Warlamowo on 23 September 1943. By then, 8. Staffel was led by Oberleutnant Horst Berger and Scholz had been replaced by Hauptmann Heinrich Ehrler as commander of III. Gruppe of JG 5. The following day, 8. Staffel was scrambled at 08:25 and ordered to intercept a Soviet formation. During this encounter, Linz claimed a P-40 and a Lend-Lease Bell P-39 Airacobra fighter aircraft shot down. These where his last claims in 1943. Linz claimed his next aerial victory on 24 February 1944 over a P-39 fighter. However, prevailing Soviet records do not reveal any matching losses. Linz claimed another P-39 fighter shot down on 8 March. The aircraft shot down may have been a misidentified Yakovlev Yak-9 fighter from the 324 IAD (Istrebitel'naya Aviatsionnaya Diviziya—Fighter Aviation Division) which lost two aircraft in that area of operations that day.

On 7 April, III. Gruppe flew many missions, escorting German shipping. On one of these missions, Linz claimed a Yak-9 fighter shot down. On 23 April, Soviet aerial reconnaissance spotted a German convoy heading west. In defense of this convoy, Linz claimed four P-39 fighters shot down. These claims cannot be linked to Soviet records which document the loss of a single P-39 fighter lost to aerial combat. On 10 May, the German airfields at Petsamo, Kirkenes and Salmiyarvi came under attack by Soviet aerial units at 01:00. 8. During this encounter, Linz claimed three P-39 fighters shot down. The next day, 7. and 8. Staffel were scrambled at 03:00. During the course of the following combat, Linz claimed two aerial victories. On 13 May, Linz claimed another aerial victory. His claim and Soviet records are not aligned, he claimed a P-39 fighterwhile the Soviet records show the loss of an Il-2 ground-attack aircraft. On 16 May, Linz became an "ace-in-a-day" for the first time, claiming three Soviet fighters and two ground-attack aircraft shot down. That day, III. Gruppe flew multiple missions in support of German shipping. On 25 May, Linz again became an "ace-in-a-day" when he shot down five enemy aircraft in defense of a German convoy. Luftwaffe pilots claimed 33 aerial victories while Soviet records document the loss of five aircraft.

On 17 June, III. Gruppe was busy flying convoy escort missions. At 07:30, III. Gruppe took off to its largest aerial battle. That day, the Soviet Air Forces attacked with 227 aircraft. In two separate engagements, German pilots claimed 66 aerial victories. On the morning mission, the Germans claimed 36 Soviet aircraft shot down. That evening, they claimed 30 further aerial victories. These 66 claims are offset by twelve documented Soviet losses. On these two missions, Linz claimed nine aerial victories. As part of the group expansion from three Staffeln per Gruppe to four Staffeln per Gruppe, Linz's 8. Staffel was re-designated and became the 11. Staffel of JG 5 on 15 August 1944. On 17 August, eight P-40 fighter aircraft of the 6 IAD, accompanied by fourteen P-39 fighter aircraft, attacked the Luostari/Pechenga airfield. In parallel, further Soviet aircraft, including a number of Boston bombers, attacked the harbor at Kirkenes. First elements of III. Gruppe were scambled at 09:25, resulting in various aerial encounters. In this combat, Linz claimed three victories. Linz claimed his last aerial victory with 11. Staffel on 3 September, a Petlyakov Pe-2 bomber shot down near Murmansk. Linz was then transferred to the Verbandsführerschule of the General der Jagdflieger (Training School for Unit Leaders) which prepared him to become a Staffelkapitän (squadron leader).

Squadron leader and death
Following completion at the Verbandsführerschule in November 1944, Linz was appointed Staffelkapitän of 12. Staffel of JG 5 on 30 November. He succeeded Leutnant Werner Gayko in this capacity. At the time, the Staffel was based at  Herdla Airfield on the island of Herdla in Askøy, Western Norway. III. Gruppe to which 12. Staffel was subordinated was commanded by Hauptmann Franz Dörr. His 12. Staffel had just been converted from the Messerschmitt Bf 109 to the Focke Wulf Fw 190 A at Bardufoss Airfield. On 1 January 1945, he was awarded the German Cross in Gold.

On 9 February 1945, Linz was shot down and killed in action flying Fw 190 A-8 (Werknummer 732183—factory number) in defense of the German destroyer Z33 in an operation which was later called Black Friday by the Allied aircrews due to their heavy unit losses. The  Z33 was the last German destroyer to leave northern Norway and sailed for Germany on 5 February 1945. It was intended that Z31, which had completed initial repairs at Bergen after being heavily damaged in the Action of 28 January 1945, would join her to make a joint passage to the Baltic. Z33 ran aground in Brufjord on 7 February, damaging her port shaft and propeller and causing both engines to fail. She was taken under tow to be repaired in Trondheim. Z33 and the two tugboats with her chose to shelter in Førde Fjord during daylight on 9 February while en route to Trondheim.

On the morning of 9 February, two Royal New Zealand Air Force Bristol Beaufighter torpedo bombers of No. 489 Squadron conducted a patrol of the Norwegian coast. These aircraft sighted a Narvik-class destroyer accompanied by a minesweeper and two flak ships in Førde Fjord. At 1:30 pm on 9 February, 32 Beaufighters were sent into the air from RAF Dallachy. The strike force was joined by either ten or twelve North American P-51 Mustang fighters from 65 Squadron and two Vickers Warwick air-sea rescue aircraft from 379 Squadron carrying life rafts to help any aircrew forced to ditch. The 9. and 12. Staffeln of JG 5 were scrambled from Herdla Airfield at 3:50 p.m. and ordered to attack the Dallachy Wing and its escorts. During this intercept mission, Linz and his wingman Feldwebel Rudolf Artner were the first Luftwaffe pilots to reach the bombers and both shot down one Beaufighter bomber each. Linz then claimed his final aerial victory over a P-51 fighter from No. 65 Squadron. Linz was then shot down.

Linz was buried at Bergen and posthumously awarded the Knight's Cross of the Iron Cross on 12 March. He was replaced by Oberleutnant Fritz Kohrt as commander of 12. Staffel. The Fw 190 A-8 flown by Linz in his last combat still exists, and is displayed in the Cottbus Hangar of the Military Aviation Museum in Pungo, Virginia, USA as of 2014.

Summary of career

Aerial victory claims
According to US historian David T. Zabecki, Linz was credited with 70 aerial victories. Spick also lists with 70 aerial victories claimed, all of which claimed on the Eastern Front in an unknown number combat missions. Mathews and Foreman, authors of Luftwaffe Aces — Biographies and Victory Claims, researched the German Federal Archives and found records for 53 aerial victory claims. This figure includes at least 51 aerial victories on the Eastern Front and two over the Western Allies.

Victory claims were logged to a map-reference (PQ = Planquadrat), for example "PQ 43 Ost 104557". These sectors were then subdivided into 36 smaller units to give a location area 3 × 4 km in size.

Awards
 German Cross in Gold on 1 January 1945 as Oberfeldwebel in the 12./Jagdgeschwader 5
 Knight's Cross of the Iron Cross on 12 March 1945 (posthumously) as Leutnant and pilot in the 12./Jagdgeschwader 5

Notes

References

Citations

Bibliography

 
 
 
 
 
 
 
 
 
 
 
 
 
 
 
 
 
 
 
 
 
 
 
 

People from Ilmenau
Military personnel from Thuringia
Luftwaffe pilots
German World War II flying aces
Luftwaffe personnel killed in World War II
Recipients of the Gold German Cross
Recipients of the Knight's Cross of the Iron Cross
1917 births
1945 deaths